Radio Dhol 94.0 FM is a Bangladeshi FM radio station. The station went live on December 10, 2015, and is currently available in Dhaka city.

Info 
Radio Dhol hits airwaves on December 10, 2015, in Dhaka at a frequency of 94.0 MHz. Currently Radio Dhol is broadcasting only in Dhaka city.

References 

Radio stations in Bangladesh
Mass media in Dhaka
Organisations based in Dhaka